A school bread or school bun ( in northern and eastern Norway, or  in western Norway) is a Norwegian sweet roll made from yeasted dough filled with custard and decorated with icing dipped in grated coconut. It was usually put in school lunches as a dessert or sold at bake sales, hence the name.

In Arctic Norway, a similar roll without icing and coconut (known as a solbolle) is eaten to celebrate the return of the sun after polar night.

See also
 List of custard desserts
 List of Norwegian desserts
 List of sweet breads

Citations

External links
 Recipe

Norwegian desserts
Sweet breads
Yeast breads
Custard desserts